Yuvina Parthavi is an Indian actress who has appeared in predominately Tamil and Kannada films and commercials. She was introduced as a child actress in AVM Productions television serial Uravukku Kai Koduppom (2011), before making a breakthrough in films portraying a young girl in Mummy - Save Me (2016) and Pushpaka Vimana (2017). She also acted in web series As I'm Suffering From Kadhal.

Career
Yuvina was introduced as a child actress in AVM Productions television serial Uravukku Kai Koduppom (2011) by director Bhuvanesh, who met Yuvina and her father Mahesh while on a tour. Her performance in the serial received acclaim, with producer M. Saravanan noting the success of the serial had "a lot to do with" Yuvina.

In 2014, she started appearing in films and her role as Nallasivam's granddaughter in Veeram, where she featured in scenes alongside Ajith Kumar was well received by critics. Subsequently, she was signed on to appear in roles in Linguswamy's production Manjapai where she played a young girl who bonds with an elderly man, as well as in a one scene appearance in AR Murugadoss's Kaththi, playing a girl at the airport cared for by Samantha. The same year, she also played a full-length role in Athithi as a kidnapped child, as well as a pivotal role in Arjun's action drama film Jaihind 2.

Filmography

Web series

Television

References

External links

2000s births
Living people
Indian film actresses
21st-century Indian child actresses
Actresses in Tamil cinema
21st-century Indian actresses
Actresses from Mumbai
Actresses in Kannada cinema
Child actresses in Tamil cinema